Kahriz-e Varvasht (also Romanized as Kahrīz-e Varvasht; also known as Kahrīz) is a village in Itivand-e Jonubi Rural District, Kakavand District, Delfan County, Lorestan Province, Iran. At the 2006 census, its population was 784, in 145 families.

References 

Towns and villages in Delfan County